Frank Ugochukwu Edwards (born 22 July 1989) is a Nigerian artiste, producer, sound engineer, worship singer and songwriter from Enugu State. He is the founder and owner of the record label Rocktown Records, which is home to recording artists such as Edwards himself, Gil, King BAS, Nkay, Dudu and, among others. He lives in Lagos, Nigeria.

Early life

Frank Ugochukwu Edwards was born into a family of seven in the Enugu state of Nigeria. He has five siblings. He began singing at the age of ten, and learned to play the piano from his father when he was young. During his teenage years, he became a born again Christian. He has six albums and many hit singles to his name. He has established himself as one of the best leading gospel artiste in Nigeria.

Musical career 
Edwards is a producer and plays several musical instruments. He is a notable keyboardist and a member of the Presidential band of Pastor Chris Oyakhilome of Christ Embassy Church. His debut album The Definition was released in 2008. It was a 14-track album and was distributed by Honesty Music. His second album Angels on the Runway was released in 2010, and his third album Unlimited was released in 2011. Tagjam was released in November 2011. In 2013 he appeared in the live performance of Sinach's "I know who I am" video. He is known for his high pitched voice. Besides being an artist with many songs that cover a variety of musical genres, he is also a music producer and a master mixer. As a result, Rocktown Records, which he owns, has a generation of upcoming talents including Gil Joe, King BAS, Divine, Nkay, Soltune, David and others. In 2016, he collaborated with famous American gospel artiste, Don Moen on an album Grace. His album Frankincense was produced in 2016. In 2018, he released an album for the Body of Christ titled Spiritual Music Season which includes songs like "Miyeruwe" (I Praise your Name), "You are Good", "Who dey run things" & "Praise Your Name". Still in 2018, he has collaborated with Nathaniel Bassey (Thy Will Be Done) and Jeanine Zoe (I'm in Love with You).

Church life
Edwards (nicknamed Frankrichboy) is a member of Christ Embassy Church in Nigeria and LoveWorld Music Ministry alongside other gospel musicians including Moses Bliss, Ada Ehi (gospel musician), Sinach, Eben, Joe Praize.

Discography

Albums 
 Definition (2008)
 Release Singles (2015)
 Frankincense (2016)
 Birthday EP (2016)
 Born in July (2017)
 Unlimited – Verse 1 (2017)
 I'm Supernatural (2018)
In Love With You (2018)
 Unlimited – Verse 2 (2018)
 Born in July (2019)
Believers Anthem (2020)
No One Like You (2020)
 Melody Album (2022)

Videography

Awards and nominations
In May 2011 he was nominated as the Gospel artiste of the year in the sixth annual Nigeria Entertainment Awards (NEA). He won the award of the best Gospel Rock artiste in the first annual awards. He also won west Africa best male vocalist in 2012/ best hit single at the Love World Awards 2012, and 3 awards at the Nigeria Gospel Music Awards (male artiste of the year, song of the year and best male vocal). His album Frankincense, which feat Micah Stampley and Nathaniel Bassey, topped Beyoncé's and Adele's albums within few hours of release on iTunes album chart.

See also
 List of Nigerian gospel musicians
 List of Igbo people

References

External links
 
 Frank Edwards songs

Musicians from Enugu
Urban contemporary gospel musicians
Living people
Nigerian gospel singers
Nigerian Christians
1989 births
Nigerian record producers
Loveworld Records artists
21st-century Nigerian male singers